Para sa 'Yo ang Laban na Ito is a 2013 Philippine television self help drama talk show broadcast by GMA Network. Hosted by Manny Pacquiao and Jean Garcia, it premiered on February 3, 2013 on the network's Sunday Grande line up. On March 23, 2013, it moved to the network's Sabado Star Power sa Gabi line up. The show concluded on April 20, 2013 with a total of 11 episodes.

Overview

The show is dubbed as GMA Network's very first "self-help" drama. It hosted by world boxing icon Manny Pacquiao and actress Jean Garcia, the show features real people with parallel life stories but have different endings. The show presented every life story via a short film and starred by some of the network's talents. Also in each episode, Pacquiao will share his own personal challenges and how he survived them with a series of difficult choices.

Following the show's main objective, Pacquiao and Garcia serve as coaches, helping and encouraging people to keep the faith, discover and believe in themselves, look straight, stand up and fight life's challenges.

With the battle cry, "Ang pagbabago ay magmumula sa desisyon mo..." (Change begins in your decision...), the hosts will challenge their guests to fight life's battle. Thus, they ask their guests this question: "Palaban ka ba?" (Are you a fighter?).

Notable episodes
 The pilot episode (February 3, 2013) featured the story of two mothers who were abandoned by their husbands and were left to raise their children alone. It is a topic close to Pacquiao's heart because he grew up with the same situation.
 The premiere episode (March 23, 2013) of the show for its new timeslot (the show moves from Sundays to Saturdays night timeslot) features the life story of Ivy Bascogin, an 18-year-old girl whose dream of being a teacher was suddenly hindered when her father has to stop from being a tricycle driver because of pneumonia. Meanwhile, her mother only earns five hundred pesos per week as a laundress. Because of poverty, Ivy was unable to continue her studies and chose to work in a small canteen as an all-around helper with a salary of one hundred per day.
 This episode (April 20, 2013) serves as the show's farewell episode. Joey de Leon guests as co-host to Jean Garcia. He also reminisces his and his mother's struggle when his father left them, and their reunion after two decades.

Ratings
According to AGB Nielsen Philippines' Mega Manila household television ratings, the pilot episode of Para sa 'Yo ang Laban na Ito earned a 9.9% rating. While the final episode scored a 12.6% rating.

References

2013 Philippine television series debuts
2013 Philippine television series endings
Filipino-language television shows
GMA Network original programming
Philippine television talk shows